Emmanuel Miguel Rivera (born June 29, 1996) is a Puerto Rican professional baseball third baseman for the Arizona Diamondbacks of Major League Baseball (MLB). He made his MLB debut in 2021 with the Kansas City Royals.

Career

Kansas City Royals

Rivera was drafted by the Kansas City Royals out of the Interamerican University of Puerto Rico in the 19th round, 579th overall, of the 2015 Major League Baseball draft. He made his professional debut with the AZL Royals, playing in 38 games with the team.

In 2016, Rivera played for the rookie-level Burlington Royals, posting a .249/.317/.373 slash line in 58 games. The following year, he played for the Single-A Lexington Legends, slashing .310/.364/.468 with 12 home runs and 72 RBI. In 2018, Rivera split the season between the High-A Wilmington Blue Rocks and the AZL Royals, batting a cumulative .274/.326/.416 with 6 home runs and 63 RBI. For the 2019 season, Rivera played for the Double-A Northwest Arkansas Naturals, logging a .258/.297/.345 slash line with 7 home runs and 57 RBI in 131 games.

Rivera did not play in a game in 2020 due to the cancellation of the minor league season because of the COVID-19 pandemic. He was assigned to the Triple-A Omaha Storm Chasers to begin the 2021 season, and batted .282/.337/.593 with a career-high 14 home runs and 40 RBI in 44 games.

On June 28, 2021, Rivera was selected to the 40-man roster and promoted to the major leagues for the first time. He made his MLB debut that day as the starting third baseman against the Boston Red Sox, and logged his first career hit in the game as well, a single off of Sox starter Garrett Richards. He was placed on the injured list on June 30 with a left hamate break.

Arizona Diamondbacks

On August 1, 2022, the Royals traded Rivera to the Arizona Diamondbacks for pitcher Luke Weaver.

References

External links

Living people
1996 births
People from Mayagüez, Puerto Rico
Major League Baseball players from Puerto Rico
Major League Baseball third basemen
Kansas City Royals players
Arizona Diamondbacks players
Arizona League Royals players
Burlington Royals players
Charlotte Stone Crabs players
Indios de Mayagüez players
Lexington Legends players
Wilmington Blue Rocks players
Northwest Arkansas Naturals players
Omaha Storm Chasers players
2023 World Baseball Classic players